A twin-boom aircraft is characterised by two longitudinal booms (extended nacelle-like bodies). The booms may contain ancillary items such as fuel tanks and/or provide a supporting structure for other items. Typically, twin tailbooms support the tail surfaces, although on some types such as the Rutan Model 72 Grizzly the booms run forward of the wing. The twin-boom configuration is distinct from twin-fuselage designs in that it retains a central fuselage.

Design

The twin-boom configuration is distinct from the twin fuselage type in having a separate, short fuselage housing the pilot and payload. It has been adopted to resolve various design problems with the conventional empennage for aircraft in different roles.

Engine mounting
For a single engine with a propeller in the pusher configuration or a jet engine, a conventional tail requires the propeller or exhaust to be moved far aft, requiring either a very long driveshaft or jet pipe and thus reducing propulsive efficiency. The twin-boom configuration allows a much shorter and more efficient installation. The Saab 21 was originally built as a pusher type and was later adapted to jet power as the 21R.

In these designs, the tailplane (horizontal stabilizer) is typically high-mounted on twin tail fins to keep it clear of the engine wake. The Scaled Composites SpaceShipOne and SpaceShipTwo sub-orbital spaceplanes adopted twin booms with outboard tails or outboard horizontal stabilizers (OHS) to keep the airframe clear of the more widely-spreading rocket engine exhaust.

Twin booms have also been adopted for twin-engined designs where the engine system includes bulky additional items such as turbochargers and heat exchangers, taking up a large volume of space. Examples include the Lockheed P-38 Lightning.

Field of view
For a rear observation or gunnery position to have an unobstructed field of view, placing it at the rear of a conventional tail moves it so far aft that problems arise with the centre of mass and balancing the aircraft. Getting rid of the conventional empennage allows the rear position to be located more forward, resolving the balance problem. An example is provided by the Focke-Wulf Fw 189.

However the twin booms and bridging tailplane still obstruct the field of view to some extent and guns in this position are especially restricted in firing to the side.

Transport access
Loading and unloading large freight or cargo items such as vehicles and containers requires large access doors. In conventional designs these doors must be located at the nose or side of the fuselage, necessitating heavy reinforcement of the main structure. Side doors limit the length of an item to the width of the door and access may also be obstructed by engines or undercarriage. The twin-boom configuration allows a large door to be placed at the rear of the fuselage, free from obstruction by the tail assembly, as on the Armstrong Whitworth AW.660 Argosy.

However access to the rear door remains limited, especially for trucks backing up to it, and a high-mounted conventional rear fuselage is often preferred.

Efficiency
Twin booms typically offer greater drag than a conventional arrangement. They are also typically shallower than the fuselage and thus inherently less stiff, requiring additional reinforcement to maintain a rigid tail position in pitch. On the other hand, tip effects on the tailplane are avoided and it is supported at both ends, allowing it to be made smaller and lighter. Moreover, span loading along the wing can reduce the structural forces between the booms and thus overall weight.

Some modern high-efficiency designs have twin booms which distribute the load along the wing span and/or stiffen the overall structure. Capable of flying non-stop round the world, the Rutan Voyager was a canard design with tractor propeller, in which the twin booms extended forwards to brace the foreplane as well as aft to support twin fins. The later Virgin Atlantic GlobalFlyer was jet propelled but with a similar range, still with large twin booms to accommodate the jet fuel in a lightweight span-loaded structure, but with a small conventional tail on each boom.

History
Twin boom designs can trace their history back to the lattices of booms used on many early boxkite aircraft. With the recognition of the tremendous drag these imposed, more compact structures covered in fabric were developed during the World War I. Prime examples include the Caproni series of trimotor bombers.
 
Around the same time, the first wooden monocoque fuselages appeared, and it wasn't long before this technique was applied to provide twin booms. Possibly the first of these was the pre-war Nieuport pusher, which used paper impregnated with Bakelite however the most successful were the AGO C.I and C.II which used a more conventional wooden shell, built up from strips of wood glued over a form. 
With the development of aluminium stressed skin monocoques later in World War I, the same technique was extended to twin boom designs, beginning in the 1920s.

Most of the early designs used twin booms to clear a rear mounted propeller, however even in World War I, several larger aircraft used them to provide a gunner with the ability to cover the underside of the tail without having to have the weight at the very extreme end of the aircraft where it posed balance and control problems.

Only in World War II, with the increasing prevalence of transporting bulky items and vehicles by air was the utility of a rear door, in line with the cabin to ease loading realized, and with it, the utility of moving the rear fuselage structure to the sides to avoid excessive height in the rear fuselage as on the Gotha Go 242 glider.
 
With the beginning of the jet age, the need for clearance for the propeller was replaced with the need to provide a clear path for hot exhaust gases. Jet engine efficiency was hampered by long intake and exhaust trunks, as were used on many early designs, and one solution was to use twin booms to shorten the exhaust trunking to the minimum, such as de Havilland used on their successful Vampire and Venom jet fighters.

A small number of designs used twin booms for other reasons, most notable being the Lockheed P-38 Lightning, whose booms contained the overly lengthy engine turbo-superchargers, which would have made for an unusually long nacelle. The final use for a twin boom to be developed was in tying together very high aspect ratio wings and canards as on the Rutan Voyager, to reduce flexing, and the weight needed to otherwise constrain it. Also, by having the mass from most of the fuel mid-span, it reduces the forces on the wings considerably, much in the same manner mounting the engines mid-span on most jet transports does.

Despite these anticipated benefits, twin booms remain unusual. For most cases, the booms are less efficient structurally in providing pitch stiffness, and produce more drag. In the case of those using twin booms to improve the field of fire downwards, it severely reduces it laterally, and often directly astern. For transports, the booms may facilitate access to the fuselage, but trucks then have to be extremely careful to not hit parts of the aircraft that they are then getting closer to. As a result, the C-119 remained an anomaly, and most successful post-war transports, such as the C-130 Hercules, reverted to a single rear fuselage.

List of twin-boom aircraft

|-
|AAI RQ-7 Shadow||US||UAV||UAV||1991|| || ||
|-
|Abrams P-1 Explorer||US||Propeller||Survey||1937||Prototype||||
|-
|AD Seaplane Type 1000||UK||Propeller||Bomber||1916||Prototype||||
|-
|Adam A500||US||Propeller||Transport||2002||Prototype||||
|-
|Adam A700||US||Jet||Transport||2003 ||Prototype||||
|-
|ADI Condor||US||Propeller||Motor glider||1981 ||Prototype||||
|-	
|AeroRIK Dingo||Russia||Propeller||Utility||1997||Prototype||-5||
|-
|AGO C.I||Germany||Propeller||Reconnaissance||1915 ||Production||||
|-
|AGO C.II||Germany||Propeller||Reconnaissance||1915 ||Production||||
|-
|AHRLAC Holdings Ahrlac||South Africa||Propeller||Attack||2014||Prototype||||
|-	
|Air Utility AU-18||US||Propeller||Transport||1945||Prototype||||
|-	
|Airmaster Avalon 680||US||Propeller||Transport||1983||Prototype|||||
|-
|Airsport Song||Czech Republic ||Propeller||Ultralight||2009 ||Production||unk.||
|-
|AISA GN||Spain||Autogyro||Utility||1982||Prototype||||
|-
|Akaflieg Stuttgart fs28 Avispa||Germany||Propeller||Utility||1972||Prototype||||
|-
|Alaparma Baldo||Italy||Propeller||Utility||1949||Production|| ca.||
|-
|Alenia Aermacchi Sky-Y||Italy||UAV||UAV||2007|| || ||
|-
|American Gyro AG-4 Crusader||US||Propeller||Utility||1935||Prototype||||
|-	
|Antonov LEM-2/OKA-33||USSR||Propeller||Transport||1937||Prototype||||
|-
|Anderson Greenwood AG-14||US||Propeller||Utility||1947||Prototype||||
|-
|ANTEX-M||Portugal||UAV||UAV||2002|| || ||
|-
|Antonov A-40||USSR||Glider||Transport||1942||Prototype||||
|-
|Arado E.340||Germany||Propeller||Bomber||n/a||Project||||
|-
|Armstechno NITI||Bulgaria||UAV||UAV||2006|| || ||
|-
|Armstrong Whitworth AW.660 Argosy||UK||Propeller||Transport||1959||Production||||
|-
|Arpin A-1||UK||Propeller||Utility||1938||Prototype||||
|-
|AVE Mizar||US||Propeller||Flying car||1973||Prototype||||
|-
|BAE Systems Phoenix||UK||UAV||UAV||1986|| || ||
|-
|BAE Systems SkyEye||UK||UAV||UAV||1973|| || ||
|-
|BAT Crow||UK||Propeller||Ultralight||1920||Prototype||||
|-
|Baykar Bayraktar TB2||Turkey||UAV||UAV||2014|| || ||
|-
|Baykar Bayraktar TB3||Turkey||UAV||UAV||2022||Project|| ||
|-
|Bell XP-52||US||Propeller||Fighter||1940||Project||||
|-
|Belyayev EOI||USSR||Propeller||Fighter||1939||Project||||
|-
|Bendix 51 & 51A||US||Propeller||Utility||1945||Prototype||||
|-
|Bestetti BN.1||Italy||Propeller||Utility||1940||Prototype||||
|-
|Blériot 125||France||Propeller||Transport||1931||Prototype||||
|-
|Blohm & Voss BV 138||Germany||Propeller||Reconnaissance||1937||Production||||
|-
|Boeing Insitu RQ-21 Blackjack||US||UAV||UAV||2012|| || ||
|-
|Bryan Autoplane||US||Propeller||Flying car||1953||Prototype||||
|-
|Bryant Dole Racer Angel of Los Angeles||US||Propeller||Racer||1927||Prototype||||
|-
|Burnelli CBY-3||Canada||Propeller||Transport||1944||Prototype||||
|-
|Burnelli GX-3||US||Propeller||Experimental||1929||Prototype||||
|-
|Burnelli UB-14||US||Propeller||Transport||1934||Prototype||||
|-
|Burnelli UB-20||US||Propeller||Transport||1930||Prototype||||
|-
|Buscaylet-de Monge 7-4||France||Propeller||Experimental||1923||Prototype||||
|-
|Buscaylet-de Monge 7-5||France||Propeller||Transport||1925||Prototype||||
|-	
|Campbell Model F||US||Propeller||Utility||1935||Prototype||||
|-
|Canaero Toucan||Canada||Propeller||Ultralight||1983||Production||+||
|-
|Caproni Ca.1||Italy||Propeller||Bomber||1914||Production||||
|-
|Caproni Ca.2||Italy||Propeller||Bomber||1915||Production||||
|-
|Caproni Ca.3||Italy||Propeller||Bomber||1916||Production||-383||
|-
|Caproni Ca.4||Italy||Propeller||Bomber||1917||Production||-53||
|-
|Caproni Ca.5||Italy||Propeller||Bomber||1917||Production||||
|-
|Caproni Ca.37||Italy||Propeller||Attack||1916||Prototype||||
|-
|Caproni Ca.61||Italy||Propeller||Bomber||1922||Prototype||-2||
|-
|CarterCopter||US||Autogyro||Transport||1998||Prototype||||
|-
|Celier Xenon 2||Poland||Autogyro||Utility||2005||Production||+||
|-
|Cessna Skymaster||US||Propeller||Transport||1961||Production||||
|-
|Cessna XMC||US||Propeller||Experimental||1971||Prototype||||
|-
|Commuter Craft Innovator||US||Propeller||Transport||2015||Prototype|||| 
|-
|Conroy Stolifter||US||Propeller||Utility||1968||Prototype||||
|-
|Continental KB-1||US||Propeller||Reconnaissance||1916||Prototype||||
|-
|Convair 106 Skycoach||US||Propeller||Utility||1946||Prototype||||
|-
|Convair Model 48 Charger||US||Propeller||Attack||1964||Prototype||||
|-
|Creative Flight Aerocat||Canada||Propeller||Transport||2001||Prototype||||
|-
|Cunliffe-Owen OA-1||UK||Propeller||Transport||1939||Prototype||||
|-
|Curtis Wright 21||US||Propeller||Utility||1947||Prototype||||
|-
|Curtiss Autoplane||US||Propeller||Flying car||1917||Project||||
|-
|Curtiss CT||US||Propeller||Bomber||1921||Prototype||||
|-
|De Havilland Sea Vixen||UK||Jet||Fighter||1951||Production||||
|-
|De Havilland Vampire||UK||Jet||Fighter||1943||Production||||
|-
|De Havilland Venom & Sea Venom||UK||Jet||Fighter||1952||Production||||
|-
|De Schelde S.20||Netherlands||Propeller||Trainer||1940||Prototype||||
|-
|De Schelde S.21||Netherlands||Propeller||Fighter||1940||Project||||
|-	
|Difoga 421||Netherlands||Propeller||Utility||1946||Prototype||||
|-
|Dyle et Bacalan DB-70||France||Propeller||Transport||1929||Prototype||||
|-
|Doblhoff WNF 342||Germany||Helicopter||Reconnaissance||1943||Prototype||||
|-
|DRDO Nishant||India||UAV||UAV||1996|| || ||
|-
|Edgley Optica||UK||Propeller||Reconnaissance||1979||Production||||
|-	
|Eldred Flyer's Dream||US||Propeller||Utility||1946||Prototype||||
|-
|Emsco B-8 Flying Wing||US||Propeller||Record||1930||Prototype||||
|-
|Fairchild C-82 Packet||US||Propeller||Transport||1944||Production||||
|-
|Fairchild C-119 Flying Boxcar||US||Propeller||Transport||1947||Production||||
|-
|Fairchild XC-120 Packplane||US||Propeller||Transport||1950||Prototype||||
|-
|Fieseler Fi 168||Germany||Propeller||Attack||1938||Project|| ||
|-
|Focke-Wulf Fw 189||Germany||Propeller||Reconnaissance||1938||Production||||
|-
|Focke-Wulf Flitzer||Germany||Jet||Fighter||1944||Project||||
|-
|Focke-Wulf Project VIII||Germany||Propeller||Fighter||n/a||Project||||
|-
|Fokker D.XXIII||Netherlands||Propeller||Fighter||1939||Prototype||||
|-
|Fokker F.25||Netherlands||Propeller||Utility||1946||Production||||
|-
|Fokker G.I||Netherlands||Propeller||Fighter||1937||Production||||
|-
|Friedrichshafen FF.34||Germany||Propeller||Bomber||1916||Prototype||||
|-
|General Airborne XCG-16||US||Glider||Transport||1943||Prototype||||
|-
|General Aircraft Cagnet||UK||Propeller||Trainer||1939||Prototype||||
|-
|General Aircraft GAL.47||UK||Propeller||Reconnaissance||1940||Prototype||||
|-
|Ghods Mohajer||Iran||UAV||UAV||1981|| || ||
|-
|Gotha Go 242||Germany||Glider||Transport||1941||Production||||
|-
|Gotha Go 244||Germany||Propeller||Transport||1942||Production||||
|-
|Gotha WD.3||Germany||Propeller||Reconnaissance||1915||Prototype||||
|-
|Grahame-White Ganymede||UK||Propeller||Bomber||1918||Prototype||||
|-
|Groen Hawk 4||US||Autogyro||Utility||1997||Prototype||||
|-	
|Grokhovsky G-37||USSR||Propeller||Transport||1934||Prototype||||
|-	
|Grokhovsky G-38||USSR||Propeller||Fighter-bomber||1934||Project||||
|-	
|Grokhovsky G-39 Cucaracha||USSR||Propeller||Fighter||1935||Prototype||||
|-
|Häfeli DH-1||Switzerland||Propeller||Reconnaissance||1916||Production||||
|-
|Hanriot H.110 & H.115||France||Propeller||Fighter||1933||Prototype||||
|-
|Henderson H.S.F.1||UK||Propeller||Transport||1929||Prototype||||
|-
|Heston JC.6||UK||Propeller||Reconnaissance||1947||Prototype||||
|-
|Hughes D-2||US||Propeller||Fighter-bomber||1942||Prototype||||
|-
|Hughes XF-11||US||Propeller||Reconnaissance||1946||Prototype||||
|-
|HWL Pegaz||Poland||Propeller||Motor glider||1949||Prototype||||
|-
|Hydra Technologies Ehécatl||Mexico||UAV||UAV||2006|| || ||
|-
|IAI Arava||Israel||Propeller||Transport||1969||Production||||
|-
|IAI Heron||Israel||UAV||UAV||1994|| || ||
|-
|IAI Scout||Israel||UAV||UAV||1981|| || ||
|-
|IAI Searcher||Israel||UAV||UAV||1992|| || ||
|-
|Ikarus 452M||Yugoslavia||Jet||Experimental||1953||Prototype||||
|-
|Ion Aircraft Ion||US||Propeller||Utility||2007||Prototype||||
|-
|I.S.T. XL-15 Tagak||Philippines||Propeller||Utility||1954||Prototype||||
|-
|Johns Multiplane||US||Propeller||Bomber||1919||Prototype||||
|-
|Kalinin K-7||USSR||Propeller||Experimental||1933||Prototype||||
|-
|Kaman HH-43 Huskie||US||Helicopter||Utility||1947||Production||||
|-
|Kamov Ka-26||USSR||Helicopter||Utility||1965||Production||||
|-
|Kamov Ka-126||USSR||Helicopter||Utility||1988||Production||||
|-
|Kamov Ka-226||Russia||Helicopter||Utility||1997||Production||||
|-
|Kingsford Smith PL.7||Australia||Propeller||Agricultural||1956||Prototype||||
|-
|Kokusai Ki-105 Otori||Japan||Propeller||Transport||1945||Prototype||||
|-
|Kokusai Ku-7||Japan||Glider||Transport||1942||Prototype||||
|-
|Kortenbach & Rauh Kora 1||Germany||Propeller||Motor glider||1973||Prototype||||
|-
|Larkin Skylark||US||Propeller||Utility||1973||Prototype||||
|-
|Lawrence Special||US||Propeller||Racer||1949||Prototype||||
|-
|Levasseur PL.200/201||France||Propeller||Reconnaissance||1935||Prototype||||
|-
|Lockheed P-38 Lightning||US||Propeller||Fighter||1939||Production||||
|-
|Lockheed XP-49||US||Propeller||Fighter||1942||Prototype||||
|-
|Lockheed XP-58 Chain Lightning||US||Propeller||Fighter||1944||Prototype||||
|-
|Lloyd 40.08 Luftkreuzer||Germany||Propeller||Bomber||1916||Prototype||||
|-
|LWF model H Owl||US||Propeller||Transport||1919||Prototype||||
|-
|Maeda Ku-1||Japan||Glider||Trainer||1941||Production||||
|-
|Macchi M.12||Italy||Propeller||Bomber||1918||Production|| ca.||
|-
|Mansyū Ki-98||Japan||Propeller||Attack||1945||Prototype||||
|-
|McCulloch J-2||US||Autogyro||Utility||1962||Production||+||
|-
|McDonnell XV-1||US||Autogyro||Experimental||1954||Prototype||||
|-
|McGaffey Aviate||US||Propeller||Utility||1935||Prototype||||
|-
|Millet Lagarde ML-10||France||Propeller||Utility||1949||Prototype||||
|-
|Mikoyan MiG-110||Russia||Propeller||Transport||1995||Project||||
|-
|Mirach 26||Italy||UAV||UAV||1992|| || ||
|-
|Mitsubishi J4M||Japan||Propeller||Fighter||n/a||Project||||
|-
|Moskalyev SAM-13||USSR||Propeller||Fighter||1940||Prototype||||
|-
|Moskalyev SAM-23||USSR||Propeller||Fighter||1943||Project|||| 
|-
|Myasishchev M-17 and M-55||USSR||Jet||Reconnaissance||1978||Production||+||
|-
|Nieuport seaplane pusher||France||Propeller||Reconnaissance||1913||Prototype||||
|-
|Nord Noratlas||France||Propeller||Transport||1949||Production||||
|-
|North American OV-10 Bronco||US||Propeller||Attack||1965||Production||||
|-
|Northrop F-15 Reporter||US||Propeller||Reconnaissance||1945||Production||||
|-
|Northrop Flying Wing||US||Propeller||Experimental||1929||Prototype||||
|-
|Northrop Grumman Firebird||US||Propeller||Reconnaissance||2010||Prototype||||
|-
|Northrop P-61 Black Widow||US||Propeller||Fighter||1942||Production||||
|-
|NPO Molniya Molniya-1||Russia||Propeller||Utility||1992||Prototype||||
|-
|OMA SUD Skycar||Italy||Propeller||Utility||2007||Prototype||||
|-
|Otto C.I||Germany||Propeller||Reconnaissance||1915||Production||||
|-
|PAL-V||Netherlands||Helicopter||Flying car||2012||Prototype||||
|-
|Piper PA-7 Skycoupe||US||Propeller||Utility||1944||Prototype||||
|-
|Pitcairn XO-61||US||Autogyro||Reconnaissance||1943||Prototype||||
|-
|Pocino PJ.1A||France||Propeller||Ultralight||1989||Prototype||||
|-
|Portsmouth Aerocar||UK||Propeller||Utility||1947||Prototype||||
|-
|Potez 75||France||Propeller||Attack||1953||Prototype||||
|-
|Praga E-51||Czechoslovakia||Propeller||Reconnaissance||1938||Prototype||||
|-
|Puget Pacific Wheelair III-A||US||Propeller||Utility||1947||Prototype||||
|-
|PZL M-15 Belphegor||Poland||Jet||Agricultural||1973||Production||||
|-
|PZL M-17||Poland||Propeller||Trainer||1973||Prototype||||
|-
|Rice Knowlton Volante||US||Propeller||Flying Car||1981||Prototype||||
|-
|Rutan Grizzly||US||Propeller||Experimental||1982||Prototype||||
|-
|Rocheville Arctic Tern||US||Propeller||Record||1932||Prototype||||
|-
|Rotor Flight Dynamics LFINO||US||Autogyro||Experimental||2006||Prototype||||
|-
|RTAF-5||Thailand||Propeller||Trainer||1984||Prototype||||
|-
|RUAG Ranger||Switzerland / Israel||UAV||UAV||1999|| || ||
|-
|Rutan Voyager||US||Propeller||Record||1984||Production||||
|-
|S-TEC Sentry||US||UAV||UAV||1986|| || ||
|-
|Saab 21||Sweden||Propeller||Fighter||1943||Production||||
|-
|Saab 21R||Sweden||Jet||Fighter||1947||Production||||
|-
|SAB AB-20 & 21||France||Propeller||Bomber||1932||Prototype||||
|-
|Sadler Vampire||US||Propeller||Ultralight||1982||Production||unk.||
|-
|SAIMAN LB.2||Italy||Propeller||Utility||1937||Prototype|||| 
|-
|Savoia-Marchetti S.64||Italy||Propeller||Record||1928||Prototype||||
|-
|Savoia-Marchetti S.65||Italy||Propeller||Racer||1929||Prototype||||
|-
|Savoia-Marchetti SM.88||Italy||Propeller||Fighter||1939||Prototype||||
|-
|Savoia-Marchetti SM.91||Italy||Propeller||Fighter-bomber|| 1943||Prototype||||
|-
|Scaled Composites ARES||US||Jet||Attack||1990||Prototype||||
|-
|Scaled Composites ATTT||US||Propeller||Transport||1986||Prototype||||
|-
|Scaled Composites Pond Racer||US||Propeller||Racer||1991||Prototype||||
|-
|Scaled Composites Proteus||US||Jet||Experimental||1991||Prototype||||
|-
|Scaled Composites SpaceShipOne||US||Rocket||Spaceplane||2003||Prototype||||
|-
|Scaled Composites SpaceShipTwo||US||Rocket||Spaceplane||2010||Prototype||||
|-
|Scaled Composites White Knight||US||Jet||Transport||2002||Prototype||||
|-
|Schneider Sch-10M||France||Propeller||Bomber||1925||Prototype||||
|-
|Schwade Kampfeinsitzer Nr 2||Germany||Propeller||Fighter||1916||Prototype||||
|-
|Schweizer RU-38 Twin Condor||US||Propeller||Reconnaissance||1995||Prototype||||
|-
|SECAN Courlis||France||Propeller||Utility||1946||Production||||
|-
|Selex ES Falco||Italy||UAV||UAV||2003|| || ||
|-
|SIAI-Marchetti FN.333 Riviera||Italy||Propeller||Utility||1952||Production||||
|-
|Siemens-Schuckert L.I||Germany||Propeller||Bomber||1918||Prototype||||
|-
|Siemens-Schuckert R.I||Germany||Propeller||Bomber||1915||Prototype||||
|-
|Sikorsky S-38||US||Propeller||Transport||1928||Production||||
|-
|Sikorsky S-39||US||Propeller||Transport||1929||Production||+||
|-
|Sikorsky S-40||US||Propeller||Transport||1931||Production||||
|-
|Sikorsky S-41||US||Propeller||Transport||1930||Production||||
|-
|SIPA S.200 Minijet||France||Jet||Trainer||1952||Prototype||||
|-
|Škoda Kauba Sk V6||Czechoslovakia||Propeller||Experimental||1944||Prototype||||
|-
|SNCAC NC.1070||France||Propeller||Attack||1947||Prototype||||
|-
|SNCAC NC.1071||France||Jet||Attack||1948||Prototype||||
|-
|SNCASO SO.8000 Narval||France||Propeller||Fighter||1949||Prototype||||
|-
|SPCA 30||France||Propeller||Bomber||1931||Prototype||||
|-
|Spectrum SA-550||US||Propeller||Utility||1983||Prototype||+||
|-
|Stearman-Hammond Y-1||US||Propeller||Utility||1931||Production|| ca.||
|-
|Stout Skycar||US||Propeller||Transport||1941||Prototype||||
|-
|Sukhoi Su-12||USSR||Propeller||Reconnaissance||1947||Prototype||||
|-
|Sukhoi Su-80||Russia||Propeller||Transport||2001||Prototype||||
|-
|Tachikawa Ki-94-I||Japan||Propeller||Fighter||n/a||Project||||
|-
|TAI Baykuş||Turkey||UAV||UAV||2003|| || ||
|-
|Teledyne Ryan Model 410||US||UAV||UAV||1988|| || ||
|-
|Terrafugia Transition||US||Propeller||Flying car||2009||Prototype||||
|-
|THK-11||Turkey||Propeller||Utility||1947||Prototype||||
|-
|Thomas-Morse MB-4||US||Propeller||Transport||1920||Prototype||||
|-
|Transavia PL-12 Airtruk||Australia||Propeller||Agricultural||1965||Production||||
|-	
|Trella T-106||US||Propeller||Utility||1949||Prototype|||| 
|-	
|Trella T-107||US||Propeller||Transport||1954||Project||||
|-
|Tupolev I-12/ANT-23||USSR||Propeller||Fighter||1931||Prototype||||
|-
|Vance Viking||US||Propeller||Racer||1932||Prototype||||
|-
|Virgin Atlantic GlobalFlyer||US||Jet||Record||2005||Production||||
|-
|Voisin E.28||France||Propeller||Bomber||1919||Prototype||||
|-
|Voisin Triplane||France||Propeller||Bomber||1915||Prototype||||
|-
|Vultee XP-54||US||Propeller||Fighter||1943||Prototype||||
|-
|Vultee XP-68 Tornado||US||Propeller||Fighter||n/a||Project||||
|-
|Wagner Aerocar||Germany||Helicopter||Flying car||1965||Prototype||||
|-
|Weick W-1||US||Propeller||Experimental||1934||Prototype||||
|-
|Weymann 66||France||Propeller||Transport||1933||Prototype||||
|-
|Willoughby Delta 8||UK||Propeller||Experimental||1939||Prototype||||
|-
|Willoughby Delta 9||UK||Propeller||Transport||1939||Project||||
|-
|WLT Sparrow||Czech Republic||Propeller||Ultralight||2010||Production||||
|-
|WNF Wn 16||Austria||Propeller||Experimental||1939||Prototype||||
|-
|Yakovlev Yak-58||Russia||Propeller||Utility||1993||Prototype||||
|-
|Yakovlev Yak-141||Russia||Jet||Fighter||1987||Prototype||||
|-
|Tengden_TB-001||China||UAV||UAV||2017||Production||||
|-
|BZK-005||China||UAV||UAV||2006||Production||||
|}

See also
 Twin tail

References

Citations

Bibliography

Green, W. and Swanborough, G.; The complete book of fighters, Salamander, 1994.

 
Aircraft configurations